Nanda Pakyan (also spelled Ananda Pakyan;  1280s –  1350s) was chief minister of Sagaing from the 1330s to the 1350s. The powerful minister placed at least three kings Kyaswa (r. 1339−49), Anawrahta II (r. 1349) and Tarabya II (r. 1349−52) on the throne, became the commander-in-chief, and ran the country.

Brief
Nanda Pakyan, formally Ananda Pakyan, was in the service of King Tarabya I in 1335/36 when the king was overthrown by his own son Shwetaungtet. The minister served the usurper but having taken bribes from the dowager queen Saw Hnaung, kept quiet about the whereabouts of her young children who were the legitimate claimants to the throne. Chronicles suggest he may have been involved with the queen herself. Nonetheless, the minister's loyalties ultimately lay with himself. When loyalists of the deposed king attacked the palace and killed Shwetaungtet, he led the palace guards and put down the loyalists, and killed Tarabya himself.

He then placed Kyaswa (r. 1339−49), the 16-year-old eldest son of the founder of the kingdom Saw Yun, on the throne. The new king appointed Nanda Pakyan chief minister and commander-in-chief with the title of Thubarit. The minister was the power behind the throne, and practically ran the country. He also placed the next two kings Anawrahta II (r. 1349) and Tarabya II (r. 1349−52) on the throne. He might have had a hand in the following king Thihapate's accession.

Notes

References

Bibliography
 
 
 
 

Sagaing dynasty
Burmese generals